The Paso del Sapo Formation is a Maastrichtian geologic formation of the Cañadón Asfalto Basin in Argentina. The siltstones of the formation were deposited in a lacustrine environment. Plesiosaur remains are among the fossils that have been recovered from its strata.

Fossil content 

 Aristonectes parvidens
 Ptychoceratodus sp.
 Flora

See also 
 Plesiosaur stratigraphic distribution

References 

Geologic formations of Argentina
Upper Cretaceous Series of South America
Cretaceous Argentina
Maastrichtian Stage of South America
Siltstone formations
Lacustrine deposits
Formations
Fossiliferous stratigraphic units of South America
Paleontology in Argentina
Geology of Patagonia
Geology of Chubut Province